Shattered is a 2022 American thriller film directed by Luis Prieto, written by David Loughery, and starring Cameron Monaghan, Frank Grillo, Lilly Krug, and John Malkovich.

Synopsis
Chris, a rich divorcee, falls in love with a mysterious woman Sky, only to find himself, his ex-wife and their child trapped. A desperate fight for survival ensues.

Cast
Cameron Monaghan as Chris Decker
Frank Grillo as Sebastian
Lilly Krug as Sky/Margaret
John Malkovich as Ronald
Sasha Luss as Jamie Decker
Ash Santos as Lisa
Ridley Bateman as Willow Decker
David Madison as Briggs
Dat Phan as Kiju

Production
Filming wrapped in Montana in June 2021.

Release
The film was released in select theaters and On Demand on January 14, 2022, and released on DVD and Blu-ray on February 22, 2022.

Reception
 

Angela Dawson of Forbes gave the film a positive review and wrote, "Spanish Filmmaker Luis Prieto Balances Income Inequality And Chills In ‘Shattered’ Thriller." Michael Nordine of Variety gave the film a negative review and wrote, "What follows has shades of everything from Misery to Audition, albeit with little of either film’s bawdy bravura." Matt Zoller Seitz of RogerEbert.com awarded the film one and a half stars, calling it "a machine that promises to fulfill certain functions. Unfortunately, the craftsmanship is lacking."

References

External links
 

2022 thriller films
2020s English-language films
American thriller films
Films shot in Montana
Films with screenplays by David Loughery
Films directed by Luis Prieto
2020s American films